Reiff is a small remote coastal crofting and fishing village, situated on Reiff Bay on the Ruhba Mòr peninsula,  in western Ross-shire, Scottish Highlands and is in the Scottish council area of Highland.

Populated places in Ross and Cromarty